Lindsay Weinstein (born February 18, 2000) is an American pair skater. With partner Jacob Simon, she won the junior silver medal at the 2016 U.S. Championships and placed 9th at the 2016 World Junior Championships.

Personal life 
Lindsay Weinstein was born February 18, 2000, in Evanston, Illinois. Formerly a student at Aptakisic Junior High School, she enrolled at Keystone Academy in 2015.

Career 
Weinstein began skating in 2003.

Partnership with Simon 
Weinstein and Simon began their partnership in April 2013 at Twin Rinks Ice Pavilion in Buffalo Grove, Illinois. Competing on the novice level, they won the pewter medal (fourth place) at the 2014 U.S. Championships.

The pair's ISU Junior Grand Prix (JGP) debut came in the 2014–15 season; they placed 5th in Ostrava, Czech Republic, and 7th in Dresden, Germany. At the 2015 U.S. Championships, they finished fourth on the junior level. They were coached by Jeremy Allen and Kristen Mita in Illinois.

In the summer of 2015, Weinstein/Simon moved to Colorado Springs, Colorado, where they are coached by Dalilah Sappenfield and Drew Meekins. They won the junior silver medal at the 2016 U.S. Championships and were named in the U.S. team to the 2016 World Junior Championships in Debrecen. The pair finished 9th overall in Hungary after placing 8th in both segments.

Programs 
(with Simon)

Competitive highlights 
JGP: Junior Grand Prix

With Simon

Single skating

References

External links 
 

2000 births
American female pair skaters
Living people
People from Evanston, Illinois
21st-century American women